A Ranger is typically someone in a military/paramilitary or law enforcement role specializing in patrolling a given territory, called “ranging”. The term most often refers to:
 Park ranger or forest ranger, a person charged with protecting and preserving protected parklands and forests.
 National Park Service ranger, an employee of the National Park Service
 U.S. Forest Service ranger, an employee of the United States Forest Service
 Ranger of Windsor Great Park, a ceremonial office of the United Kingdom
 Ranger (character class), a class that appears in many different role-playing games

Ranger or Rangers may also refer to:

Arts and entertainment

Publications
 Ranger's Apprentice, a series of novels by John Flanagan
 Ranger Rick, a children's nature magazine published by the United States National Wildlife Federation
 Ranger (magazine), a former British comic magazine

Fictional entities
 Rangers (comics), a Marvel Comics superhero team
 Ranger (Middle-earth), a fictional group by the Dúnedain of the North and South in the third age
 Ranger (Dungeons & Dragons), the character class as it appears specifically in the game of D&D
 Ranger (Transformers)
 Rangers, fictional warriors in the television special Babylon 5: The Legend of the Rangers
 Rangers, in Poul Anderson's The Corridors of Time
 Royal Wessex Rangers, a fictional military unit portrayed in Spearhead (TV series)
 Power Rangers, an American franchise built around a live action children's television series

Other uses in culture
 Rangers (band), a Czech pop folk and country band
 Ranger: Simulation of Modern Patrolling Operations, a board game

Law enforcement/paramilitary

United States
 Arizona Rangers
 California Rangers
 Colorado Mounted Rangers
 New Mexico Mounted Patrol
 New York State Forest Rangers
 Texas Ranger Division
 National Park Service Law Enforcement Rangers

Elsewhere
 Canadian Rangers, a Canadian paramilitary force 
 Newfoundland Rangers, a former Canadian police force
 Pakistan Rangers, a Pakistani paramilitary force; they are also known as Punjab Rangers
 Sarawak Rangers, a former Malaysian paramilitary force

Military

Asia
 Ranger Courses (Japan Ground Self-Defense Force), commando training courses at the Japan Ground Self-Defense Force
 1st Scout Ranger Regiment, a unit of the Philippine Army
 Royal Ranger Regiment, a unit of the Malaysian Army
 Sarawak Rangers a unit of the Kingdom of Sarawak
 Thahan Phran or Thai Rangers, a paramilitary light infantry force and auxiliary of the Royal Thai Army
 Royal Thai Army Ranger, part of the Royal Thai Army Special Warfare Command
 Vietnamese Rangers, a unit of the South Vietnamese Army
 Lebanese Commando Regiment, an elite light infantry and a special forces regiment in the Lebanese Armed Forces

Europe
 Army Ranger Wing, the elite special operations forces of the Irish Defence Forces
 4th Alpini Paratroopers Regiment, a ranger regiment of the Italian Army specializing in mountain combat
 Rangers Battalion (Macedonia), a special operations force in the Army of the Republic of North Macedonia
 Special Operations Troops Centre, the counter-terrorist and unconventional warfare special forces division of the Portuguese Army, nicknamed Rangers
 
 Current
 Ranger Regiment (United Kingdom), regular regiment formed 2021, no relation to previous "Rangers" of the Territorial Army
 Sherwood Rangers Yeomanry, a squadron of the Royal Yeomanry
 Former
 Royal Irish Rangers, a regiment of the British Army until 1992.  Soldiers with the rank of Private in the Royal Irish Regiment (since 1992) are given the designation of "Ranger"
 The Rangers (British regiment), a volunteer unit of the British Army, originally formed in 1860
 Connaught Rangers, a Regiment of the British Army, disbanded 1922
 88th Regiment of Foot (Connaught Rangers), line infantry regiment of the army formed in 1793 and disbanded in 1881
 Adams' Rangers, a unit in the American Revolutionary War
 Butler's Rangers, a unit in the American Revolutionary War
 King's Rangers, a unit in the American Revolutionary War
 Queen's Rangers, a unit in the American Revolutionary War
 Rogers' Rangers, a unit in the French and Indian War
 Burke's Rangers, irregular skirmisher infantry unit formed in 1747 for service in King George's War, disbanded in 1762
 Danks' Rangers, irregular skirmisher infantry unit formed in 1756 for service in the French and Indian War, disbanded in 1762
 Gorham's Rangers, irregular skirmisher infantry unit formed in 1744 for service in King George's War, disbanded in 1762

North America
 Rogers' Rangers, an 18th-century predecessor to several modern Ranger companies

 Canada
 Current
 The Queen's York Rangers (1st American Regiment) (RCAC), a Canadian Army reserve regiment based in Ontario
 Rocky Mountain Rangers, a Canadian Army reserve regiment based in British Columbia
 Canadian Rangers, a sub-component of the Canadian Forces reserve
 Junior Canadian Rangers, a youth organization
 Former
 Pacific Coast Militia Rangers, irregular World War II volunteer force and a forerunner to the Canadian Rangers
 The Prince of Wales Rangers (Peterborough Regiment)
 The York Rangers, a Canadian Army reserve infantry regiment amalgamated into The Queen's York Rangers (1st American Regiment) (RCAC)
 The Manitoba Rangers, a Canadian Army reserve infantry regiment converted to artillery, now known as the 26th Field Artillery Regiment, RCA
 23rd Alberta Rangers, a Canadian Army reserve cavalry regiment amalgamated into the 19th Alberta Dragoons (now part of the South Alberta Light Horse)
 127th Battalion (12th York Rangers), CEF, a World War I unit of the Canadian Expeditionary Force
 172nd Battalion (Rocky Mountain Rangers), CEF, a World War I unit of the Canadian Expeditionary Force
 176th Battalion (Niagara Rangers), CEF, a World War I unit of the Canadian Expeditionary Force
 199th Battalion Duchess of Connaught's Own Irish Rangers, CEF, a World War I unit of the Canadian Expeditionary Force
 220th Battalion (12th Regiment York Rangers), CEF, a World War I unit of the Canadian Expeditionary Force
 The Rocky Mountain Rangers (1885), a Canadian irregular cavalry / mounted infantry unit that served in the North-West Rebellion of 1885
 Caldwell's Western Rangers, a Canadian militia skirmisher infantry unit in the War of 1812
 United States
 Current
 75th Ranger Regiment, US Special Operations unit
 United States Army Rangers
 Former
 Goodyear Ranger, a commercial blimp purchased by the U.S. Navy during World War II for use as a training airship
 Georgia Regiment of Horse Rangers, a Continental Army unit in the Revolutionary War
 Hawk Mountain Ranger School, a ground search and rescue school within the Civil Air Patrol, the U.S. Air Force Auxiliary
 Indiana Rangers, a 19th-century mounted militia force
 Knowlton's Rangers, the U.S.'s first espionage organization
 Loudoun Rangers, a Union Army unit in the Civil War
 McNeill's Rangers, a Confederate Army unit in the Civil War
 Missouri Rangers, a 19th-century militia created during War of 1812
 Oregon Rangers, a 19th-century militia
 Terry's Texas Rangers, a Confederate Army unit in the Civil War
 United States Mounted Rangers, serving on the Great Plains, 1832-1833
 United States Rangers in the War of 1812
 Whitcomb's Rangers, a Continental Army unit in the Revolutionary War

Places

United States
 Ranger, Georgia
 Ranger, Indiana
 Ranger, Missouri
 Ranger, Texas
 Ranger, West Virginia
 Ranger Lake, Ohio
 Ranger Peak (disambiguation)

Other places
 Ranger Uranium Mine, Northern Territory, Australia
 Ranger College, Texas

Scouting
 Ranger (Girl Guide)
 Ranger Award, a Boy Scouts of America award
 Boy Rangers of America, a scouting program

Sports

Association football
 Rangers F.C. (disambiguation)
 Rangers F.C., based in Glasgow, Scotland
 Queens Park Rangers F.C., based in London, England
 Swope Park Rangers, based in Kansas City, Missouri
 Rangers de Talca, based in Talca, Chile

Gaelic football
 Argideen Rangers GAA, a club in Timoleague
 Brickey Rangers GAA, a club outside Dungarvan
 Carbery Rangers GAA, a club in Rosscarbery
 Crossmaglen Rangers GAC, a club in Armagh
 Laune Rangers GAA, a club in Killorglin
 Nemo Rangers GAA, a club in Cork

Baseball
 Arizona League Rangers, a minor league team in Surprise, Arizona
 Dallas Rangers, a minor league team in Dallas, Texas
 Dominican Summer League Rangers, a minor league team in the Santo Domingo, Dominican Republic
 Drew Rangers baseball, the team of Drew University in Madison, NJ
 Gastonia Rangers, a minor league team in Gastonia, North Carolina
 Texas Rangers (baseball), a Major League Baseball team in Arlington, Texas
 Toowoomba Rangers, a club in Toowoomba, Queensland

Ice hockey
 Binghamton Rangers, an American Hockey League team in Binghamton, New York
 Colorado Rangers, a 1987-1988 International Hockey League team in Denver, Colorado
 Denver Rangers, a 1988-1989 International Hockey League team in Denver, Colorado
 Drummondville Rangers, a junior team in Drummondville, Quebec
 Earls Court Rangers, an English National League team in West London, England
 Fort Worth Rangers, played 1941–42 in the AHA, and 1945–49 in the USHL
 Glanbrook Rangers, a Niagara & District Junior C Hockey League team in Glanbrook, Ontario
 Kitchener Rangers, an Ontario Hockey League team in Kitchener, Ontario
 New York Rangers, a National Hockey League team based in New York, New York
 North York Rangers, a Metro Junior A Hockey League team in North York, Ontario
 South Grenville Rangers, an Eastern Ontario Junior B Hockey League team in South Grenville, Ontario
 Toronto Young Rangers, an Ontario Hockey Association team in Toronto
 Winnipeg Rangers (disambiguation)

Rugby
 Broughton Rangers, a British rugby league team
 Saddleworth Rangers, a British Rugby league team
 Waitakere Rangers, a New Zealand rugby team

Other sports
 Dandenong Rangers, an Australian women's basketball team
 München Rangers, an American football team from Munich, Germany
 New Cross Rangers, a British speedway team
 Rangers Sports Events (Lebanon), sports events organized yearly by the Rangers Regiment of the Lebanese army
 Rangers cricket team, a Zimbabwean cricket team
 Madikwe Rangers, South Africa field hockey club

Transportation

Air
 Ranger Engines, a former aircraft engine company
 Parker 2nd Ranger, a motorglider
 RUAG Ranger, a Swiss unmanned air vehicle
 Vashon Ranger R7, an American light-sport aircraft design

Land
 Ranger (automobile), a 1968-1976 General Motors (GM) car model
 Cadillac Gage Ranger, an armored truck
 Edsel Ranger, a 1958-1960 American sedan
 Ford Ranger, an American pick-up truck
 Hino Ranger, a Japanese cab-over truck
 Ranger, a series of off-road vehicles by Polaris Industries
 Rickman Ranger, a UK series of GRP kit-cars also produced in Russia by Autokam
 Bush Ranger (car), an Australian four wheel drive buggy
 A type of Rover ticket which allows unlimited travel in the UK for one day

Water
 Ranger (ship), a list of ships
 Ranger (yacht), a 1930s racing sailboat
 Ranger Boats, for bass fishing
 Ranger Yachts, an American sailboat manufacturer
 Ranger-class tanker, a series of Royal Fleet Auxiliary ships
 HMS Ranger, the name of several Royal Navy ships
 USS Ranger, the name of several U.S. Navy ships
 USC&GS Ranger, an American survey ship
 Ocean Ranger, a semi-submersible mobile offshore drilling unit that sank in 1982

Other uses
 Ranger (surname), a list of people
 Black Rock Ranger, a volunteer mediator at the Burning Man festival
 Ranger (file manager), a free text-based file manager for Unix-like systems
 Ranger (ride), a type of inverted pendulum ride
 Colorado Ranger, a horse breed
 Royal Rangers, a Christian youth movement
 As-Saaffat ("The Rangers"), 37th sura of the Qur'an
 Ranger program, a series of American unmanned Lunar space missions

See also
 
 
 
 
 Power Rangers (disambiguation)
 Range (disambiguation)
 Texas Rangers (disambiguation)
 The Ranger (disambiguation)